KIJN-FM (92.3 FM) is a radio station  broadcasting a religious format. Licensed to Farwell, Texas, United States, the station serves the Clovis, New Mexico area.  The station is an affiliate of the Kingdom Keys Radio Network, rebroadcasting the programming of KJRT. The station is currently owned by Top O' Texas Educational Broadcasting Foundation.

References

External links

IJN-FM
Parmer County, Texas